Roniéliton Pereira Santos or simply Rôni (born 28 April 1977) is a Brazilian former footballer who played as a striker.

Career statistics

Club

International

International goals
Scores and results list Brazil's goal tally first.

Honours

Club
Vila Nova
Goiás State League: 1995
Brazilian League (3rd division): 1996

Fluminense
Brazilian League (3rd division): 1999
Rio de Janeiro State League: 2002

Atlético Mineiro
Brazilian League (2nd division): 2006

Flamengo
Rio de Janeiro State League: 2007
Taça Guanabara: 2007

Goiás
Goiás State League: 2006

Gamba Osaka
AFC Champions League: 2008
Emperor's Cup: 2008

References

External links
 

 CBF 
 placar 
 mercadofutebol 

1977 births
Living people
Brazilian footballers
Brazilian expatriate footballers
Brazil under-20 international footballers
Brazil international footballers
1999 FIFA Confederations Cup players
Vila Nova Futebol Clube players
São Paulo FC players
Fluminense FC players
Al Hilal SFC players
FC Rubin Kazan players
PFC Krylia Sovetov Samara players
Russian Premier League players
Expatriate footballers in Russia
Goiás Esporte Clube players
CR Flamengo footballers
Clube Atlético Mineiro players
Cruzeiro Esporte Clube players
Expatriate footballers in Japan
J1 League players
Yokohama F. Marinos players
Gamba Osaka players
Santos FC players
Campeonato Brasileiro Série A players
Association football forwards
Saudi Professional League players
Sportspeople from Tocantins